Where My Communist Heart Meets My Capitalist Mind is the second studio album by alternative rock band Sounds Under Radio.

Songs "All You Wanted" and "Sing" were featured in season 1 of The Vampire Diaries on episodes "Let the Right One In" and "Isobel", respectively.  All You Wanted also appeared on The Vampire Diaries: Original Television Soundtrack
.

Track listing

Personnel 

Sounds Under Radio
 Lang Freeman - voice, guitar
 Bradley Oliver - bass, voice, synth, piano
 Sonny Sanchez - drums, percussion
 Doug Wilson - guitar, effects

Additional Musicians
 Avi Ghosh - additional keyboards (track 12)

Production
 Will Hoffman - production, engineering, mixing
 Lang Freeman - production/engineering (tracks 6, 9, 11, 12) 
 Joey Benjamin - engineering (assistant)
 Will Krienke - engineering (assistant)
 Ryan Lipman - engineering (assistant)
 Bob Boyd - mastering

Design
 Sonny Sanchez - art direction & design
 Jeff Ray - photography & concept
 Shawn Lyon - layout
 Sam Stone - boy (model)

References

2011 albums